Baudoinia is a fungal genus  in the family Teratosphaeriaceae. It was created to hold the single species Baudoinia compniacensis, which was formerly known as Torula compniacensis. Four additional species were added to the genus in 2015. The genus was named in honor of the 19th-century French pharmacist Antonin Baudoin, who first recorded the description of a black, sooty mold that grew near distilleries in Cognac, France. The story of the rediscovery and renaming of this genus was told in an article in the magazine Wired in 2011.

References

External links

Capnodiales
Dothideomycetes genera
Taxa described in 2007